Safiqoli Khan (also spelled Safi Qoli; died 1632) was a Safavid official of Georgian origin, who served as the governor (hakem) of Lar in 1629-1630 (1st tenure) and in 1632 (2nd tenure) during the reign of king Safi (r. 1629–1642). 

A scion of the Undiladze clan, he was a son of Imam-Quli Khan and thus a grandson of the highly celebrated Safavid military commander and statesman Allahverdi Khan. In late 1632, during the widespread purges that were initiated by the order of king Safi himself, Safiqoli was executed along with his father and brother.

References

Sources
  
 
 

1632 deaths
Iranian people of Georgian descent
Undiladze
Safavid governors of Lar
Shia Muslims from Georgia (country)
People executed by Safavid Iran
17th-century people of Safavid Iran